North Stratford is an unincorporated community in the town of Stratford in Coos County, New Hampshire, United States. It is located in the northwest corner of the town, along the Connecticut River and adjacent to Bloomfield, Vermont.

North Stratford is located at the junction of U.S. Route 3 and Bridge Street, which becomes Vermont Route 105 when it crosses the Connecticut River. Route 3 leads north to Colebrook and south to Groveton and Lancaster.

North Stratford has a ZIP code of 03590 and is the location of the only post office in the town of Stratford.

Climate

According to the Köppen Climate Classification system, North Stratford has a warm-summer humid continental climate, abbreviated "Dfb" on climate maps.

Notable person 

 Minik Wallace (1890-1918), Inuit brought to the United States from Greenland by explorer Robert Peary in 1897

References

Unincorporated communities in Coös County, New Hampshire
Unincorporated communities in New Hampshire